Graeme Macrae Burnet (born October 1967) is a Scottish writer, whose novels have won and been nominated for several awards. He has also written occasionally for The Guardian, The Observer and Le Monde. His first novel, The Disappearance of Adèle Bedeau, earned him the Scottish Book Trust New Writer Award in 2013, and his second novel, His Bloody Project (2015), was shortlisted for the 2016 Man Booker Prize. His third novel, The Accident on the A35, is a sequel to The Disappearance of Adèle Bedeau. In 2017, he won the Author of the Year category in the Sunday Herald Culture Awards. One review in The Guardian described Burnet's novels as an experiment with a genre that might be called "false true crime". In July 2022, Burnet's novel Case Study (2021) was named on the longlist of the Booker Prize.

Personal life 
Burnet was born in Kilmarnock, Scotland, in 1967. On his mother’s side, he has family ties to the northwest Highlands. He has degrees in English Literature and International Security Studies from Glasgow and St Andrews universities respectively. After university, he spent some years teaching English as a second language in Prague, Bordeaux, Porto and London, before returning to Glasgow and working for eight years with various independent television companies.

Novels

The Disappearance of Adèle Bedeau (2014) 
Set in small-town France, The Disappearance of Adèle Bedeau is a compelling psychological portrayal of a peculiar outsider pushed to the limit by his own feverish imagination. The novel received a New Writer's Award from the Scottish Book Trust and was longlisted for the Waverton Good Read Award. The Herald described it as "a captivating psychological thriller ... very accessible and thoroughly satisfying."

His Bloody Project (2015) 
Burnet’s second novel tells the story of a brutal triple murder in a remote Scottish Highland community during the 1860s. Lauded by critics and hugely popular with readers, His Bloody Project won the Saltire Society Fiction Book of the Year Award and the Vrij Nederland Thriller of the Year Award. It was shortlisted for the Man Booker Prize, the Los Angeles Times Book Awards and the 2017 European Crime Fiction Prize. His Bloody Project has been published in more than 20 languages, including German, Russian, Chinese, French, Spanish, Persian and Estonian. The Telegraphs Jake Kerridge described it as "an astonishing piece of writing" and one review in The Guardian stated that the novel "richly deserves the wider attention the Booker has brought it".

The Accident on the A35 (2017) 
The Accident on the A35 is the follow-up to The Disappearance of Adèle Bedeau and the second part of a projected Saint-Louis trilogy. This novel was longlisted for the Theakston Old Peculier Crime Novel of the Year 2018 and the Hearst Big Book Awards – Harpers Bazaar Modern Classics 2018.

Case Study (2021) 
Published by Saraband, Case Study is longlisted for the 2022 Booker Prize.

Awards and selected recognition 
 New Writer's Award from the Scottish Book Trust for The Disappearance of Adèle Bedeau  
 Longlisted for the Waverton Good Read Award for The Disappearance of Adèle Bedeau 

 Saltire Society Fiction Book of the Year Award for His Bloody Project 
 Shortlisted for the 2016 Man Booker Prize for His Bloody Project 
 Shortlisted for the Los Angeles Times Book Awards for His Bloody Project 

 Shortlisted for the 2017 European Crime Fiction Prize for His Bloody Project 

 Vrij Nederland Thriller of the Year Award for His Bloody Project 
 Longlisted for the Theakston Old Peculier Crime Novel of the Year 2018 for The Accident on the A35
 Longlisted for the 2022 Booker Prize for Case Study

References

External links
 Official website

1967 births
Living people
21st-century Scottish novelists